Linton Falls may refer to the following:

Linton Falls (North Yorkshire), on the River Wharfe
Linton Falls Hydro, a hydroelectric station above the falls
Linton Falls (Oregon), a waterfall in the Three Sisters Wilderness

See also
Linton (disambiguation)